Netrokona-2 is a constituency represented in the Jatiya Sangsad (National Parliament) of Bangladesh since 2019 by Ashraf Ali Khan Khasru of the Awami League.

Boundaries 
The constituency encompasses Barhatta and Netrokona Sadar upazilas.

History 
The constituency was created in 1984 from a Mymensingh constituency when the former Mymensingh District was split into four districts: Mymensingh, Sherpur, Netrokona, and Kishoreganj.

Ahead of the 2014 general election, the Election Commission expanded the boundaries of the constituency. Previously it had excluded one union parishad of Netrokona Sadar Upazila: Maugati.

Members of Parliament

Elections

Elections in the 2010s

Elections in the 2000s 

Abdul Momin died in July 2004. Abu Abbas of the BNP was elected in an October 2004 by-election.

Elections in the 1990s

References

External links
 

Parliamentary constituencies in Bangladesh
Netrokona District